Under the personal status code, and Sharia law, polygyny is legal in Mauritania. A man can marry up to four women, but must obtain the consent of his existing wife/wives first. Polygamy is common within the Afro-Mauritanian and Berber Moorish population, occurring less frequently among the Arab Moorish population. A 2007 MICS3 reports that 10.7% of women aged 15-49 are in a polygamous union.

See also 
 Child marriage in Mauritania

References

Marriage in Mauritania
Mauritania